Eshqabad (also Romanized as ‘Eshqābād and Ishqābād) is a village in Fasharud Rural District, in the Central District of Birjand County, South Khorasan Province, Iran. At the 2016 census, its population was 11, in 6 families.

References 

Populated places in Birjand County